Mere Khwabon Mein Jo Aaye is a 2009 Indian Hindi-language romantic drama film directed by Madhureeta Anand and starring Randeep Hooda, Raima Sen, and Arbaaz Khan. The title of the film was based on the song of the same name from Dilwale Dulhania Le Jayenge (1995).

Cast 
Randeep Hooda as Jai Hoods 
Raima Sen as Maya V. Singh, Jai's love interest / Meera
Arbaaz Khan as Vikram Singh, Maya's husband 
Suhasini Mulay as Mrs. Mathur
Neil Bhoopalam as Ali
Juhi Pandey as Tanya 
Javed Akhtar as a judge
Ashwini Kalsekar as Mrs. Kapoor
Eka Kumari Singh as Priya Singh, Maya and Vikram's daughter 
Anjan Srivastav as Mr. Mathur
Lalit Pandit as a judge
Alka Yagnik as a judge
Murli Sharma as a concertgoer

Production 
Randeep Hooda was cast to play eighteen characters. He learned the flute and Raima Sen learned the harmonica.

Soundtrack

Release 
The Hindustan Times gave the film a rating of one-and-half out of five stars and wrote that "If this film was meant to be about women’s empowerment, fantasy is a strange way to go. If it was meant to be a caper, the few laughs it raises are entirely unintentional". The Times of India gave the film the same raing and wrote that "Was it supposed to be about female empowerment, wish fulfilment, self-realisation or clandestine romance? Can't say, 'cause nothing really comes through in this completely garbled venture which sees Raima Sen sharing sweet nothings with ready-for-a-fancy-dress Randeep Hooda who happens to be as unreal as the film itself". Indian Express wrote that "This could have been a nice, light-hearted lark. What we get instead is a lost opportunity, top lining Arbaaz who doesn't get to crack a single smile, Raima who tries very hard to rise above the script, and major irritant Randeep, who changes costumes and strikes poses".

References

External links 

 Indian romantic drama films
2009 romantic drama films
2009 films